Like a Stranger may refer to:
 Like a Stranger (album), an album by Johnny O
 Like a Stranger (EP), an EP by Kitten
 "Like a Stranger", a song by The Psychedelic Furs from the album Mirror Moves
 "Like a Stranger", a song by Kitten from their self-titled album

See also
"Like Strangers", a song popularized by The Everly Brothers in 1960